Walk Tall may refer to:

 Walk Tall (country song), 1964
 Walk Tall (film), a 1960 Western
 Walk Tall (The Cannonball Adderley Quintet song), a 1960s song from Country Preacher, a 1969 live album by The Cannonball Adderley Quintet
 Walk Tall (album), a 1998 album by Eric Marienthal
 Walk Tall (John Mellencamp song), 2004
 "Walk Tall", a 1991 song by Orchestral Manoeuvres in the Dark from the album Sugar Tax

See also
Walking Tall (disambiguation)